Charles A. Cross (born 15 May 1900) was an English professional footballer who played in the Football League for Coventry City, Crystal Palace and Wolverhampton Wanderers, as a defender.

Playing career
Cross began his career at Coventry City and in 1922, signed for Crystal Palace then playing in the Football League Second Division. Between then and 1928, he made 221 League appearances without scoring. Cross then moved on to Wolverhampton Wanderers. He had made 237 senior appearances in all competitions for Palace without scoring.

References

External links
Charles Cross at holmesdale.net

English footballers
Footballers from Coventry
English Football League players
Association football defenders
Coventry City F.C. players
Crystal Palace F.C. players
Wolverhampton Wanderers F.C. players
1900 births
Year of death missing